The Unity Fiji Party (UFP) is a registered political party in Fiji. It was registered as a political party in July 2017. The party's leader is Savenaca Narube, the former Governor of Reserve Bank of Fiji.

On 11 May 2018 the party announced a list of 14 candidates to contest the 2018 election. It subsequently submitted a list of 28 candidates, of which 5 were women.

The party won 6,896 votes in the 2018 election, 1.52% of the total. However, it failed to win any seats. In the 2022 the party almost doubled its vote share, up to 2.78%, but it failed again to get parliamentary representation.

Electoral history

Parliamentary elections

References

External links
 Official website

Political parties established in 2017
Political parties in Fiji
2017 establishments in Fiji